Kiltsi Manor (also known as Schloß Aß, Schloss Ass, or Gilsenhof) is a knight’s manor in Väike-Maarja Parish, present day Lääne-Viru County, Estonia.  It is number 16079 on the Estonian State Register of Cultural Monuments.

History
Kiltsi Manor is first recorded in 1466.  It is believed to have been built in the 14th or 15th century in what was then Kiltsi Castle which was destroyed in the Livonian War.  In the Middle Ages Kiltsi belonged to the Gilsens, from which it gets its German name Gilsenhof.  In the 17th century, Kiltsi was in Asseri parish, and was thus under he ownership of the Uexküll, Zoeged, Mannteuffel, and Rosen families.  In 1784 Kiltsi manor was acquired by Major Hermann Johann von Beckendorff, who built a new main house in early classical style (with non-classical turrets) within the manor walls in 1790.  From 1816 the manor belonged to famed explorer and scholar Adam Johann von Krusenstern until his death at Kiltsi in 1846.  The manor stayed in the Krusenstern family until the early part of the 20th century.

The manor’s last private owner was Alfred von Uexkll-Gyldenband.  Since 1920 the manor has been home to a school.

Gallery

See also
 List of palaces and manor houses in Estonia

References 
Ants Hein.Kiltsi mõis. Võsupere, VR Kirjastus 2011. (in Estonian)

External links 

 Kiltsi Manor, No. 16079 on the State Register of Cultural Monuments
 Commemorative postage stamp
Kiltsi manor estate portal in Estonia (in Estonian)
Kiltsi manor at Väike-Maarja Municipality
Image of Johann Christoph Brotze collection: Plan of "Das Schloß Ass" (in German)

Väike-Maarja Parish
Manor houses in Estonia
Buildings and structures in Lääne-Viru County
Kreis Wierland
Tourist attractions in Lääne-Viru County